Stearoceras is an extinct genus of prehistoric nautiloids from the Lower Pennsylvanian (Upper Carboniferous) - Lower Permian with a fair worldwide distribution.(Kümmel 1964)

Stearoceras is recognized by its involute shell with a depressed subtrapizoidal whorl section and slight ventral and lateral lobes. In contrast Stenoporceras is subdiscoidal and has a suture with broad lateral lobes and a deep ventral saddle as found in syringonautilids.(ibid)

Nautiloids are a subclass of shelled cephalopods that were once diverse and numerous but are now represented by only a handful of species.

See also

 Nautiloid
 List of nautiloids

References

 Kümmel, B. 1964. Nautiloidea -Nautilida; Treatise on Invertebrate PaleontologyPart K, Curt Teichert & R.C Moore,(eds) Geological Society of America & Univ. Kansas Press.
 Sepkoski, J.J. Jr. 2002. A compendium of fossil marine animal genera. D.J. Jablonski & M.L. Foote (eds.). Bulletins of American Paleontology 363: 1–560. Sepkoski's Online Genus Database (CEPHALOPODA)

Prehistoric nautiloid genera
Pennsylvanian first appearances
Cisuralian genus extinctions